UIS Irish Plaza, or United Irish Societies Irish Plaza, is a park and memorial dedicated to honoring Metro Detroit's Irish immigrant community and their descendants.

History

Led by Ed Neubacher and Mike McGunn, with graphic assistance by Margaret O'Neill, the project began in 2001 when Michigan Department of Transportation granted the United Irish Societies permission to use the property for a commemorative plaza. Funding for project was obtained through the sale of various elements of the landscape and hardscape, the primary components being engraved brick pavers. On Sunday, May 21, 2006 the United Irish Societies Irish Plaza was dedicated as a "memorial for past and present members of the Irish community, and the starting point for the St. Patrick's Parade for present and future generations to come."

It continues to be used as the starting point for the Detroit St. Patrick's Parade, and a gathering place for various events in the Detroit Irish community.

See also
 Corktown
 North Corktown

References

Corktown, Detroit
Parks in Detroit
Irish-American culture in Michigan
Culture of Detroit
History of Detroit
2006 establishments in Michigan